Vernonia baldwinii, commonly known as western ironweed or Baldwin's ironweed, is a perennial herb native to the central United States. It is in the Asteraceae (aster) family.

Description
Vernonia baldwinii is a tall, perennial herb with rhizomes. The larger leaves have serrated edges. The upper surface of the leaves is minutely hairy, and the lower surface has longer, often bent or tangled hairs. 

The inflorescence is showy and somewhat flat-topped, consisting of irregularly branched terminal panicles, and measures  or more across. Flowerheads have 17 to 34 disk flowers only, with no ray flowers.

Taxonomy

The genus Vernonia is named for the English botanist William Vernon, and the species baldwinii is named for William Baldwin, the American botanist and physician who collected the plant.

The common name "western ironweed" is derived from the range of the plant, the western United States, and derived from the toughness of the stem and roots of the plant.

Distribution and habitat
It grows in dry soil in prairies, pastures, open grounds, and woods, ranging from Iowa to Missouri, Nebraska, Kansas, and Texas.

Ecology
The flowers bloom in the summer, from May to September, attracting bees, butterflies, and other insects. American goldfinches and other birds eat the seeds.

References

External links
 
 

baldwinii
Flora of the Western United States
Flora of Arkansas